The 2009–10 Lithuanian Hockey League season was the 19th season of the Lithuanian Hockey League, the top level of ice hockey in Lithuania. Four teams participated in the league, and Sporto Centras Elektrenai won the championship.

Standings

External links
Season on hockeyarchives.ru

Lithuanian Hockey League
Lithuania Hockey League seasons
2009–10 in Lithuanian ice hockey